Úvalno is a municipality and village in Bruntál District in the Moravian-Silesian Region of the Czech Republic. It has about 1,000 inhabitants.

History
The first written mention of Úvalno is from 1238.

Transport
Úvalno is located on the Opava–Krnov railway line.

Notable people
Hans Kudlich (1823–1917), Austrian political activist, writer and physician

Twin towns – sister cities

Úvalno is twinned with:
 Branice, Poland

References

External links

Villages in Bruntál District